The 1995–96 League of Ireland First Division season was the 11th season of the League of Ireland First Division.

Overview
The First Division was contested by 10 teams and Bray Wanderers won the division.

Final table

Promotion/relegation play-off
Third placed Home Farm Everton played off against Athlone Town who finished in tenth place in the 1995–96 League of Ireland Premier Division. The winner would compete in the 1996–97 League of Ireland Premier Division.

1st Leg

2nd Leg

Home Farm Everton won 4–3 on penalties and were promoted to the Premier Division

See also
 1995–96 League of Ireland Premier Division

References

League of Ireland First Division seasons
2
Ireland